IPD may refer to:

Medicine
 Idiopathic Parkinson's disease
 Impulsive personality disorder
 In-patient department
 Inter-pupillary distance, the distance between the center of the pupils of the two eyes
 Invasive pneumococcal disease

Organizations
 International Product Development, also known as IPD USA or IPD Volvo, is a USA-based manufacturer and seller of automotive parts for Volvo cars, such as the Volvo C30
 Initiative for Policy Dialogue, an organization based at Columbia University
 Chartered Institute of Personnel and Development, a professional association for human resource management professionals

Police departments
 Indianapolis Police Department, former police department of Indianapolis and preceding agency of the Indianapolis Metropolitan Police Department
 Independence Police Department (Missouri), police department of Independence, Missouri
 Inglewood Police Department, Inglewood, California
 Irvington Police Department, police department of Irvington, New Jersey

Other uses
 Initial professional development
 Independence Day (1996 film), a 1996 American science fiction disaster film 
 Integrated passive devices
 Iterated prisoner's dilemma, in game theory
 Integrated powerhead demonstrator, a rocket engine
 Integrated project delivery, a project delivery method
 Individual participant data, a method for conducting a meta-analysis

See also 
IDP (disambiguation)